Ariastes muellerae is a species of beetle in the family Cerambycidae. It was described by Vives in 2003.

References

Dorcasominae
Beetles described in 2003